Punit Balan is  an entrepreneur, filmmaker, social worker, sports enthusiast.  He is the trustee and head of  Shrimant Bhausaheb Rangari Ganapati utsav in Pune.  He is also the  owner of various sports teams like Pune Jaguars (Tennis), Mumbai Khiladis (Kho Kho), Maharashtra Iron Man (Handball), Premier Badminton, Table Tennis.  He has given financial support to talented and needy players in various sports from different parts of India.

Film

References

External links

Indian filmmakers
Living people